Malavika may refer to:

Mononym
 Malavika (actress), Indian film actress
 Malavika (singer), Tollywood playback singer and TV anchor

Given name
 Malavika Avinash, Indian film actress
 Malavika Harita, CEO of advertising and communications company Saatchi & Saatchi Focus
 Maalavika Manoj, Indian independent musician and songwriter
 Malavika Menon, Indian film actress in Malayalam and Tamil films
 Malvika Nair (actress, born 1998), Indian actress who appears in Tamil, Telugu and Malayalam films
 Malavika Nair (actress, born 1999), Indian actress who appears in Malayalam films
 Malavika Shivpuri, Indian actress and dubbing artiste
 Malavika Wales, Malayalam film actress
 Malavika Krishnadas, Malayalam television actress, host and dancer.